Robert Andrew Dobek (born October 4, 1952, in Detroit, Michigan) is a retired professional ice hockey player who played 72 games in the World Hockey Association for the San Diego Mariners between 1976 and 1977 after starring for the US team in the 1976 Winter Olympics as well as the Bowling Green State University men's hockey team in the early 1970s.

Awards and honors

References

External links 

1952 births
American men's ice hockey centers
Ice hockey people from Detroit
Ice hockey players at the 1976 Winter Olympics
Living people
Olympic ice hockey players of the United States
San Diego Mariners players
Bowling Green Falcons men's ice hockey players
Charlotte Checkers (SHL) players